Historical battles fought in and around the city of Baton Rouge, Louisiana include:

Battle of Baton Rouge (1779), Spanish victory in the American Revolutionary War
Battle of Baton Rouge (1862), Union victory in the American Civil War